The New Party (Portuguese: Partido Novo, stylised NOVO) is a classical liberal, libertarian party in Brazil founded on 12 February 2011.

The party was registered on 23 July 2014, supported by the signatures of 493,316 citizens. Its creation was approved on 15 September 2015. The party requested to use the number "30" for election identification. It is ideologically aligned with classical liberalism.

Ideology 
The New Party supports policies that reduce the state's interference in the economy. It does not take any stance on social issues like abortion and legalization of drugs. The party is pro-gun rights and supports same sex marriage. The party positions itself as classical-liberal.

Policy proposals 
The party's proposals include reforming the ways parties are allowed to obtain funding and ending compulsory voting, and defending private financing of campaigns.

The party aims for the privatization of public enterprises like Petrobras and Banco do Brasil although the party supports welfare programs like Bolsa Família. The party defends the Vouchers policy to improve the inequality between public and private education. In short, he argues that the State should focus on the areas of essential services: education, health and security.

The party opposes extensive regulation in many aspects of Brazilian society and their members believe the central bank should be independent from the state.

The program of the party focuses on the defense of a democratic state which preserves Civil liberties, incentivizes Entrepreneurship and the participation of the citizen on the political life. The main objective of the party, according to the founders, is to secure economic liberty, as well as "ending privileges" instead of "protecting an elite".

National Presidents

Electoral Results

Presidential election

Legislative elections

References

External links
 New Party (Partido Novo) website
 Panorama Mercantil – Interview with João Dionisio Amoêdo – President of Novo
 Época – Interview with João Dionísio Amoedo – President of Novo
 Valor Econômico – João Dionísio Amoedo talks about the creation of Novo
 Folha de S.Paulo – João Dionísio Amoedo talks about the challenge of creating Novo

2011 establishments in Brazil
Classical liberal parties
Libertarian parties
Libertarianism in South America
Political parties established in 2011
Political parties in Brazil
Right-wing parties in South America